Michele Ann Marie "Shelley" Fabares (born January 19, 1944) is an American actress and singer. She is best known for her television roles as Mary Stone on the sitcom The Donna Reed Show (1958–1963) and as Christine Armstrong on the sitcom Coach (1989–97), the latter of which earned her two Primetime Emmy Awards nominations.

In 1962, her recording of "Johnny Angel" reached number one on the Billboard Hot 100 chart.

Biography

Early life
Fabares was born in Santa Monica, California on January 19, 1944. She is the niece of actress Nanette Fabray (née Fabares). She graduated from North Hollywood High School in 1961.

Her father was James Alan Fabares, who was born in Algiers, New Orleans on 2 August 1909, and died in Los Angeles on 10 December 1977, and her mother was Elsa R. Eyler, who died from Alzheimer's disease in 1992. She has an older sister Nanette ("Smokey").(Source: Ancestry.com)

Early TV appearances
Fabares's acting debut was at the age of 3. At the age of 10, she made her first appearance on television in an episode of Letter to Loretta, "The Clara Schuman Story" (1954).

Early TV appearances included the Producers' Showcase adaptation of Our Town starring Frank Sinatra and Paul Newman. She was Young Cathy in a Matinee Theatre adaptation of Wuthering Heights.

Fabares had small parts in The Girl Rush (1955), Never Say Goodbye (1956), The Bad Seed (1956), Rock, Pretty Baby! (1956), Jeanne Eagels (1957), Marjorie Morningstar (1958), and Summer Love (1958).

On TV she was in Captain Midnight, Annie Oakley, Fury, and Colgate Theatre.

She portrayed Moselle Corey on Annette (1958) starring Annette Funicello.

She guest starred on Mr. Novak, The Eleventh Hour, Arrest and Trial, and The Twilight Zone ("Black Leather Jackets").

The Donna Reed Show

In 1958, Fabares landed the role of Mary Stone in the long-running family sitcom The Donna Reed Show. This ran until 1966. Fabares quickly established herself as a favorite with teen audiences.

"Donna Reed was simply an extraordinary woman, a woman of great strength, kindness, integrity and compassion," said Fabares later of her television mother.

Singer
Fabares' national popularity led to a recording contract and two "Top 40" hits, including "Johnny Angel", which went to number one on the Billboard Hot 100 in April 1962, and peaked at number 41 in the UK. It sold over one million copies and was certified gold. She released an album, Shelley!. "I was stunned about that, to put it mildly," she later said. "After all, I never could sing."

This was followed by a second album, The Things We Did Last Summer, which included two hit songs "Johnny Loves Me" (no. 21) and "The Things We Did Last Summer" (no. 46).

Fabares left The Donna Reed Show in 1963 (she would return periodically until its end in 1966) to pursue other acting opportunities. She released a third album, Teenage Triangle in 1963.

Film career
Fabares was one of the female leads in the surf film Ride the Wild Surf (1964). She was Elvis Presley's leading lady in Girl Happy (1965) for MGM and played the love interest of Peter Noone of Herman's Hermits and sings Make Me Happy in Hold On! at the same studio.

MGM made a pilot for a TV series based on Meet Me in St. Louis with Fabares in the lead but no network was receptive to it.

She was reunited with Elvis for Spinout (1966) at MGM and Clambake (1967), at United Artists.

Sam Katzman cast her as the love interest of a young Hank Williams Jr. in A Time to Sing (1968).

TV guest spots
Film roles dried up in the late 1960s and Fabares went back to guest starring on shows like The Ghost & Mrs. Muir, Daniel Boone, Medical Center, Lancer, Bracken's World, and The Interns.

Fabares said she went through a period where she struggled to find work. "I went to bed on Tuesday having worked since I was 3. I got up Wednesday morning and didn't work for four years, went to bed Wednesday night after four years, got up and interviewed for a Mannix episode and started working again. I think this business is very cyclical. You go through busy times and you go through dead times."

After Mannix, she was in Longstreet, Owen Marshall, Counselor at Law, Love, American Style, Rockford Files, McCloud and Cade's County.

"I wasn't a big risk-taker," she said later. "I should have been more aggressive. I was nervous and scared to try something really different."

Fabares had support roles in TV movies like Brian's Song (1971) (playing the wife of Brian Piccolo, played by James Caan), and Two for the Money (1972). Her performance in Brian's Song earned her a Golden Globe nomination.

The Brian Keith Show, The Practice
Fabares had a regular role on The Brian Keith Show (1972–1974), known as The Little People during its first season, which lasted for 47 episodes.

When the show ended she resumed guest shots: Police Story, Ironside, The Rockford Files, The Rookies, Matt Helm, Medical Story, Marcus Welby, M.D., Barnaby Jones, and Spencer's Pilots.

She had a role in the TV movie Sky Heist (1975) and from 1976 to 1977 had a regular part on The Practice with Danny Thomas.

Forever Fernwood, One Day at a Time and Highcliffe Manor
She then had a regular role on Forever Fernwood.

In 1978, Fabares played Francine Webster on the CBS sitcom One Day at a Time, a role she reprised for the last three years of the show. "I was Francine, a rather villainous character," she said later. "She was wonderful. She saw the world only through her eyes, and it never occurred to her that other people didn't."

She was also in episodes of Lucan, Vega$, The Incredible Hulk, Hello, Larry, and Fantasy Island.

Fabares was in the TV movies Pleasure Cove (1979), Donovan's Kid (1979), Friendships, Secrets and Lies (1979) and The Great American Traffic Jam (1980).

She had the starring role in the TV series Highcliffe Manor (1979) but it only lasted six episodes.

1980s
In the 1980s Fabares could be seen on Mork & Mindy, Matt Houston, The Love Boat, Newhart, and Murder, She Wrote.

She did a TV movie Memorial Day (1983) with Mike Farrell who became her husband, as well as movies Suburban Beat (1985), The Canterville Ghost (1985), Hot Pursuit (1987), and Run Till You Fall (1988).

Coach
In 1989, she won the role of Christine Armstrong Fox on the ABC sitcom Coach. "Here was an intelligent, funny, well-written series," Fabares said "And the people putting it on wanted me to play a very successful, ambitious woman in it."

The series originally struggled in the ratings until it shifted to play after Roseanne. It was a hit and played until 1997.

For her work, Fabares was nominated twice for a Primetime Emmy Award, and, in 1994, she was honored by the Young Artist Foundation with its Former Child Star "Lifetime Achievement" Award for her role as Mary Stone on The Donna Reed Show.

During the series' run Fabares appeared on Love or Money (1990), Deadly Relations (1993), The Great Mom Swap (1995), and A Nightmare Come True (1997).

Later career
After Coach ended in 1997, Fabares voiced the role of Martha Kent on Superman: The Animated Series. She reprised the role twice, once for a 2003 episode of Justice League and again for the direct-to-video film Superman: Brainiac Attacks (2006).

She was in Playing to Win: A Moment of Truth Movie (1998).

From 2004 to 2011 she produced the Screen Actors Guild Awards.

Personal life 
In 1964, Fabares married producer Lou Adler. They separated in 1966 and divorced in 1980. Since 1984, she has been married to actor Mike Farrell.

In October 2000, Fabares received a liver transplant after being diagnosed with autoimmune hepatitis.

Filmography

Discography

Studio albums
 Shelley! -- Colpix CP-426 (Mono)/SCP-426 (Stereo) -- #106, 7/62
 The Things We Did Last Summer—Colpix CP-431/SCP-431 -- #121, 10/62
 Teenage Triangle—Colpix CP-444/SCP-444 -- #48, 5/63
Featuring four tracks each by Shelley, James Darren and Paul Petersen
 Bye Bye Birdie—Colpix CP-454/SCP-454—1963
Songs from the movie sung by Shelley, The Marcels, James Darren and Paul Petersen
 More Teenage Triangle—Colpix CP-468/SCP-468—1964
Second compilation featuring Shelley, James Darren and Paul Petersen

Soundtrack songs
 "Spring Fever" (1965) w/Elvis Presley from the movie Girl Happy (The soundtrack album only features Elvis' vocals)
 "Make Me Happy" (March 1966) from the movie soundtrack of Hold On! MGM Records
 "Next Time I Say Goodbye I'm Leaving" (1968) from the movie soundtrack of A Time to Sing (Music From The Original Soundtrack) MCA Records– MCA-1458

Compilations
 Rare Items And Big Hits Colpix (1989)
 The Best of Shelley Fabares Rhino R2 71651—1994
 Shelley Fabares Johnny Angel Collectables #9931 July 2005
 Shelley Fabares Meets Paul Petersen Collectables Records July 2009
 Growing Up-The 1962 Recordings Jasmine 2014

Singles

Awards and nominations

References

External links

 
 

1944 births
Living people
20th-century American actresses
21st-century American actresses
Actresses from Santa Monica, California
American child actresses
American child singers
American women pop singers
American film actresses
American television actresses
American voice actresses
Colpix Records artists
Liver transplant recipients
Musicians from Santa Monica, California
Vee-Jay Records artists
California Democrats